Wrightoporia casuarinicola is a species of fungus in the family Bondarzewiaceae. Described as new to science in 2006, it is found in southern China.

Description
It has resupinate (crust-like) fruit bodies, a lilac to vinaceous brown pore surface and simple septate generative hyphae.

References

External links

Fungi described in 2006
Fungi of China
Russulales
Taxa named by Yu-Cheng Dai
Taxa named by Bao-Kai Cui